Enver Kazaz (born 15 January 1962) is a Bosnian literary historian, literary critic, writer, social commentator and publicist.  He is a Centennial Professor and head of the departament of Croatian literature in the wider department of comparative literature of the University of Sarajevo.

Biography

He was born in the village of Kamenica, a part of the municipality of Ilijaš to a Bosniak family. He studied South Slavic literature at the University of Sarajevo where he graduated in 1985. He earned his post-graduate degree from the University of Belgrade Faculty of Philology in 1991 with a thesis on the spirit of modernity in Musa Ćazim Ćatić's poetry. In 2000, he earned his PhD from the University of Sarajevo with a thesis on Bosniak novelists of the 20th century.  He had worked as a researcher in the Sarajevo-based Institute for Literature from 1986 to 1992. He has been a Centennial Professor, head of the departament of Croatian literature and comparative Slavic Studies since 1996. Since 2005, he is a visiting professor at the University of Warsaw. He was one of the founders of the Zoro publishing house and the founder and editor-in-chief of the literary journal Lica.  He is also one of the founders of the Open University of Sarajevo. He is a noted left-wing social and political commentator and activist. In 2017, he has signed the Declaration on the Common Language of the Croats, Serbs, Bosniaks and Montenegrins.

Selected bibliography

 Musa Ćazim Ćatić – književno naslijeđe i duh moderne, Centar za kulturu, Tešanj 1997.
 Morfologija palimpsesta, Centar za kulturu, Tešanj 1999.
 Antologija BH priče (co-authored by Ivan Lovrenović and Nikola Kovač,) Alef, Sarajevo 2000.
 Bošnjački roman XX vijeka, Naklada Zoro, Zagreb-Sarajevo 2004.
 Neprijatelj ili susjed u kući, Rabic, Sarajevo 2008.
 Traži se. Međunarodni centar za mir, Sarajevo 1996. (poezija).
 Subverzivne poetike, Sinopsys, Zagreb-Sarajevo, 2012.
 Rat i priče iz cijelog svijeta, (koautor Ivan Lovrenović) Novi liber, Zagreb, 2009.
 Unutarnji prijevodi, (co-authored by Davor Beganović), Naklada Ljevak-Karver, Zagreb-Podgorica, 2011.
 Na razvalinama, Synopsis (Sarajevo, 2014).- (poezija)

References

External links
 Enver Kazaz at unsa.ba

1962 births
Living people
Signatories of the Declaration on the Common Language